Coleophora lewandowskii is a moth of the family Coleophoridae. It is found in Poland and Lithuania.

References

lewandowskii
Moths described in 1953
Moths of Europe